Thure Andersson (1907–1976) was a Swedish wrestler. He was born in Ölme. He won an Olympic silver medal in Freestyle wrestling in 1936.

References

External links

1907 births
1976 deaths
Olympic wrestlers of Sweden
Wrestlers at the 1936 Summer Olympics
Swedish male sport wrestlers
Olympic silver medalists for Sweden
Olympic medalists in wrestling
Medalists at the 1936 Summer Olympics
20th-century Swedish people